Should Ladies Behave is a 1933 American pre-Code comedy film directed by Harry Beaumont and written by Bella Spewack and Sam Spewack, adapted from the play, "The Vinegar Tree" by Paul Osborn. The film stars Lionel Barrymore, Alice Brady, Conway Tearle, Katharine Alexander and Mary Carlisle. The film was released on December 1, 1933, by Metro-Goldwyn-Mayer.

Plot

Cast
Lionel Barrymore as Augustus Merrick
Alice Brady as Laura Merrick
Conway Tearle as Max Lawrence
Katharine Alexander as Mrs. Winifred Lamont
Mary Carlisle as Leone Merrick
William Janney as Geoffrey Cole
Halliwell Hobbes as Louis

References

External links 
 

1933 films
American comedy films
1933 comedy films
Metro-Goldwyn-Mayer films
Films directed by Harry Beaumont
American black-and-white films
1930s English-language films
1930s American films